Since Scotland's first One Day International (ODI) in 1999, 77 players have represented the team. A One Day International (ODI) is an international cricket match between two representative teams, each having ODI status, as determined by the International Cricket Council (ICC). An ODI differs from Test matches in that the number of overs per team is limited, and that each team has only one innings. The list is arranged in the order in which each player won his first ODI cap. Where more than one player won his first ODI cap in the same match, those players are listed alphabetically by surname. Scotland played their first ODI matches at the 1999 Cricket World Cup. Since 1 January 2006, Scotland has had official ODI status, meaning that any one-day match it plays after that date against the Test-playing nations, or against another side with ODI status, is an official ODI. The ICC currently grants temporary ODI status to associate (non-Test) nations for four-year cycles based on performances at World Cup qualification events. Scotland retains official ODI status at least until the end of the 2018 Cricket World Cup Qualifier.

Scotland have played 146 ODIs, resulting in 63 victories, 75 defeats, 1 tie and 7 no results. At the 2007 World Cup, Scotland lost all three of their matches and failed to pass beyond the group stages. Scotland risk losing players to the county cricket system in England during the British summer, where teams representing 18 of the traditional counties of England compete.

Calum MacLeod made the highest score for Scotland on 23 January 2014 when he scored 175 against Canada. Josh Davey holds the records for the best bowling figures for Scotland in an ODI with 6/28 against Afghanistan on 14 January 2015. Kyle Coetzer is Scotland's leading run-scorer with 3,124 runs and Safyaan Sharif holds the record for most wickets in ODIs for Scotland with 90.

Key

Players
Statistics are correct as of 21 February 2023.

Captains

George Salmond was Scotland's first ODI captain, leading his team in the 1999 World Cup. In the intervening years between the World Cup and Scotland gaining ODI status in 2006, the captaincy had passed on to Craig Wright. After his team were knocked out of the 2007 World Cup in the first round, Wright resigned the captaincy. He was replaced by Ryan Watson. Watson said Wright was a hard act to follow and he intended "to pick up where Craig left off, bring in some of my own ideas and hopefully achieve the same level of success". Early in 2009, after Scotland failed to qualify for the 2011 World Cup, Watson stepped down as captain and was replaced by Gavin Hamilton.

See also
Scotland national cricket team
List of Scotland Twenty20 International cricketers

Notes

References

External links
Searchable database of International Cricketers (filtered by country) (Howstat)
List of Scotland ODI Caps and debuts (Cricinfo)

 
Scotland ODI
Cricketers